Pat Flaherty may refer to:

 Pat Flaherty (racing driver) (1926–2002), American racecar driver
 Pat Flaherty (actor) (1897–1970), American actor
 Pat Flaherty (American football) (born 1956), American football coach 
 Pat Flaherty (baseball) (1866–1946), Major League Baseball third baseman
 Pat Flaherty (politician) (1923–2013), Australian politician

See also
 Patsy Flaherty (Patrick Flaherty, 1876–1968), American Major League Baseball pitcher
 Michael Patrick Flaherty, main character in the sitcom Spin City